Georgios Maris (1882–1949) was a Greek politician. He was three times minister of the interior of Greece  (1924–1925, 1928, 1929–1930, 1933. He was minister of finance (1928–1932), the economy (1924), communication (1924) and agriculture (1924–1925).

References
Rulers.org

Ministers of the Interior of Greece
1882 births
1949 deaths